Calvin Eugene "Gene" Taylor (March 19, 1929 – December 22, 2001), was an American jazz double bassist. He was born in Toledo, Ohio, and began his career in Detroit, Michigan. Taylor worked with Horace Silver from 1958 until 1963.  He then joined Blue Mitchell's quintet, with whom he recorded and performed until 1965. From 1966 until 1968, he toured and recorded with Nina Simone. Simone recorded the song "Why? (The King of Love is Dead)", which Taylor wrote following the assassination of Martin Luther King Jr. Taylor began teaching music in New York public schools.  Taylor worked with Judy Collins from 1968 until 1976, and made numerous television appearances accompanying Simone and Collins.  He died on December 22, 2001, in Sarasota, Florida, where he had been living since 1990.

Discography

As sideman
 Roland Alexander: Pleasure Bent (New Jazz, 1961)
 Junior Cook: Junior's Cookin' (Jazzland, 1961)
 Barry Harris: Barry Harris Plays Tadd Dameron (Xanadu Records, 1975)
 Coleman Hawkins: Supreme (Enja Records, 1966)
 Junior Mance: Harlem Lullaby (Atlantic, 1967)
 Eddie Jefferson: Coming Along With Me (OJC, 1969)
 Eric Kloss: Doors (Cobblestone, 1972)
 Blue Mitchell: The Cup Bearers (Blue Note, 1963), Down with It! (Blue Note, 1965), Boss Horn (Blue Note 1967), Heads Up! (Blue Note 1967)
 Duke Pearson: Profile (Blue Note, 1963), The Right Touch (Blue Note 1967), Tender Feelin's (Blue Note 1967)
 Horace Silver: Finger Poppin' (Blue Note, 1959), Blowin' the Blues Away (Blue Note, 1959), Horace-Scope (Blue Note, 1960), The Tokyo Blues (Blue Note, 1962), Song for My Father (Blue Note, 1964)
 John Wright: The Last Amen (New Jazz, 1961 [1965])

References

External links 

1929 births
2001 deaths
Musicians from Toledo, Ohio
American jazz double-bassists
Male double-bassists
20th-century American musicians
20th-century double-bassists
20th-century American male musicians
American male jazz musicians